The Roman Catholic Diocese of Tabasco (erected 25 May 1880) is a suffragan diocese of the Archdiocese of Yucatán.

Ordinaries
Agustín de Jesús Torres y Hernandez, C.M. (1881 - 1885) 
Perfecto Amézquita y Gutiérrez, C.M. (1886 - 1896) 
Francisco Maria Campos y Angeles (1897 - 1907) 
Leonardo Castellanos y Castellanos (1908 - 1912) 
Antonio Hernández y Rodríguez (1912 - 1922) 
Pascual Díaz y Barreto, S.J. (1922 - 1929) 
Vicente Camacho y Moya (1930 - 1943) 
José de Jesús Angulo del Valle y Navarro (1945 - 1966) 
Antonio Hernández Gallegos (1967 - 1973) 
Rafael Garcia González (1974 - 1992) 
Florencio Olvera Ochoa (1992 - 2002) 
Benjamín Castillo Plascencia (2003 - 2010)
Gerardo de Jesús Rojas López (2010 - )

Episcopal See
Villahermosa, Tabasco

External links and references

Tabasco
Tabasco, Roman Catholic Diocese of
Tabasco
Tabasco